Radek Škvor (born 29 March 1989 in Prague, Czechoslovakia) is a Czech actor and voice actor. Škvor contributes to voicing characters in anime, cartoons, movies, and more content. He is well known for voicing Ash Ketchum in the Czech-language version of the Pokémon anime.

Škvor is also known for dubbing over many actors such as Tom Felton, Shia LaBeouf, Daniel Logan, Oliver Robins, Trevor Morgan, Shawn Pyfrom, Doug Brochu and other famous actors.

Currently, Škvor works at DW Agentura, Studio Virtual, and other dubbing studios in the Czech Republic.

Filmography

Acting
 Český Robinson
 Martin in The Decadent Visitor
 Tomáš in Queen of the Lake
 Ondřej in Bakaláři
 Eric in Operation Noah
 O poklad Anežky české
 Vítek in A Royal Promise
 Little brother 2 in Princess Alisea

Voice dubbing roles

Animation
 Ash Ketchum in Pokémon
 Rock Lee and other characters in Naruto (Animax edition)
 Izzy Izumi in Digimon
 Ash Ketchum in Pokémon: The First Movie
 Ash Ketchum in Pokémon: The Movie 2000
 Ash Ketchum in Pokémon 3: The Movie
 Ash Ketchum in Pokémon 4Ever
 Ash Ketchum in Pokémon: Jirachi Wish Maker
 Ash Ketchum in Pokémon: Destiny Deoxys
 Ash Ketchum in Pokémon: Giratina and the Sky Warrior
 Franklin and the Green Knight (Minimax and DVD editions)
 Back to School with Franklin
 Darkwing Duck (2nd dub)
 The Animatrix
 Andy in Toy Story 2
 Hey Arnold!: The Movie
 The Little Polar Bear

Live action
 Andrew Van de Kamp and Eddie Orlofsky (Episode 128) in Desperate Housewives
 Bart Allen, Garth Ranzz, and other characters in Smallville
 LJ Burrows in Prison Break
 Scott Brody in Cats & Dogs
 Ted's Future Son in How I Met Your Mother
 Brad Taylor in Home Improvement
 Ben Marshall in Driving Lessons (Česká televize edition)
 Matt McNamara (Season 3 only) in Nip/Tuck
 Robbie Freeling in Poltergeist (TV Nova/TV Prima edition)
 Robbie Freeling in Poltergeist II: The Other Side (TV Nova edition)
 Mikey Ubriacco in Look Who's Talking Now (TV Nova edition)
 Trevor McKinney in Pay It Forward
 Young Danny in Pearl Harbor
 Grady Mitchell in Sonny with a Chance
 Milo in Delivering Milo
 Zack Mazursky in Alpha Dog
 Willie Morris in My Dog Skip
 Draco Malfoy in Harry Potter
 Morgan Hess in Signs
 Boba Fett in Star Wars: Episode II – Attack of the Clones
 Rhett Baker in The Glass House
 Short Round in Indiana Jones and the Temple of Doom (TV Nova edition)
 Sam Witwicky in Transformers (DVD and TV Nova editions)
 Sam Witwicky in Transformers: Revenge of the Fallen
 Sam Witwicky in Transformers: Dark of the Moon
 Jesse Braun in A Nightmare on Elm Street

References

External links
 

Living people
Male actors from Prague
Czech male film actors
Czech male voice actors
1989 births